In enzymology, a 7-methylxanthosine synthase is an enzyme that catalyzes the chemical reaction

S-adenosyl-L-methionine + xanthosine  S-adenosyl-L-homocysteine + 7-methylxanthosine

Thus, the two substrates of this enzyme are S-adenosyl methionine and xanthosine, whereas its two products are S-adenosylhomocysteine and 7-methylxanthosine.

This enzyme belongs to the family of transferases, specifically those transferring one-carbon group methyltransferases.  The systematic name of this enzyme class is S-adenosyl-L-methionine:xanthosine N7-methyltransferase. Other names in common use include xanthosine methyltransferase, XMT, xanthosine:S-adenosyl-L-methionine methyltransferase, CtCS1, CmXRS1, CaXMT1, and S-adenosyl-L-methionine:xanthosine 7-N-methyltransferase.

References 

 
 
 
 

EC 2.1.1
Enzymes of unknown structure